Terry Flanagan (October 17, 1956 - December 29, 1991) was a Canadian ice hockey player and coach.

Flanagan played four years with the New Hampshire Wildcats men's ice hockey team, and was an assistant coach at Bowling Green State University for seven seasons before succumbing to cancer.

Two major awards are named in Flanagan's honour: The Terry Flanagan Award is presented annually by the American Hockey Coaches Association (AHCA) to honour an assistant coach's career body of work; and the Terry Flanagan Memorial Award was an annual award presented by the now defunct Central Collegiate Hockey Association (CCHA) to the player who best demonstrated perseverance, dedication and courage while overcoming severe adversity as voted by the coaches of each CCHA team.

References

External links
 
 

1956 births
1991 deaths
Canadian ice hockey coaches
Canadian ice hockey players
Bowling Green Falcons ice hockey coaches
New Hampshire Wildcats men's ice hockey players